Constitutional Assembly elections were held in Guatemala on 1 July 1984. Although the Guatemalan Christian Democracy received the most votes, an alliance of the National Liberation Movement and Nationalist Authentic Centre emerged as the largest bloc with 23 of the 88 seats. Voter turnout was 78%.

Results

References

Bibliography
Villagrán Kramer, Francisco. Biografía política de Guatemala: años de guerra y años de paz. FLACSO-Guatemala, 2004.
Political handbook of the world 1984. New York, 1985.

Elections in Guatemala
1984 in Guatemala
Guatemala